The Asbestos Hazard Emergency Response Act (AHERA) is a US law that  required the EPA to create regulations regarding local educational agencies  inspection of  school buildings for asbestos-containing building material, prepare asbestos management plans, and perform asbestos response actions to prevent or reduce asbestos hazards. AHERA was implemented under the Toxic Substance Control Act of 1986.
AHERA demanded the EPA  develop a  plan for states for accrediting persons conducting asbestos inspection and corrective-action activities at schools. Whistleblowers are protected from retribution by the act.

References

Asbestos
Hazardous air pollutants
Carcinogens
IARC Group 1 carcinogens
Occupational safety and health
Industrial minerals
Air pollution in the United States
United States federal environmental legislation
1986 in law
1986 in the environment
1986 in the United States
Environmental law in the United States